Chewy, Inc. is an American online retailer of pet food and other pet-related products based in Plantation, Florida. In 2017, Chewy was acquired by PetSmart for $3.35 billion, which was the largest ever acquisition of an e-commerce business at the time.

History

2011-2019: Founding and pre-IPO 
Chewy was founded under the name "Mr. Chewy" in June 2011 by Ryan Cohen and Michael Day.  The company hired former employees and executives from Amazon, PetSmart, Whole Foods Market, and Wayfair. In March 2012, the company estimated a total yearly revenue of $26 million, despite losing money in its first half year. From 2014 to 2015, sales grew from $205 million to $423 million.

By 2017, the company had revenue of approximately $2 billion and 51% of online pet food sales in the US. At that time, Ryan Cohen prepared to take Chewy public as both Petco and PetSmart approached with merger offers. Petco's offer would be paid for in part using stock, whereas PetSmart offered an all-cash bid that would also allow Chewy to remain a completely separate business. Chewy was acquired by PetSmart in May 2017 for $3.35 billion, which at the time was the largest ever acquisition of an e-commerce business. PetSmart later transferred 20% of its ownership stake in Chewy to private equity firm BC Partners, which has owned PetSmart since 2014, and also spun off an additional 16.5% of Chewy to an unrestricted subsidiary in 2018.

Following the acquisition, Cohen remained CEO and operated the business largely as an independent unit of PetSmart. Between 2017 and 2018, Chewy’s sales increased from $2.1 billion to $3.5 billion, with 66% of sales coming from customers signed up for automatic recurring shipments. In 2018, Chewy created Chewy Pharmacy, an online pharmacy providing prescription medications. Orders placed through the business are completed in coordination with a team of veterinarians.

2019-present: Post-IPO
On April 29, 2019, Chewy filed an S-1 for an initial public offering, intending to trade under the ticker symbol CHWY. In its filing, Chewy reported a net loss of $268 million on total sales of $3.5 billion for its 2018 fiscal year. Chewy went public on June 14, 2019, at $22 per share. In the 2019 fiscal year, Chewy earned net sales of $4.85 billion, a 40 percent year-over-year increase on a 52-week to 52-week basis. The company saw increased demand from millions of existing and new customers as the business sustained growth throughout the economic disruption of the COVID-19 era.

Chewy launched a free tele-triage service called Connect With a Vet in October 2020. In November 2020, Chewy announced that it would produce and fulfill orders of customized prescription medications, commonly referred to as compounding, for instances where commercial alternatives are absent. In 2020, it was announced that PetSmart and Chewy would be separated by private equity firm BC Partners Inc. in a recapitalization plan; the process began in early 2021. In 2020, total yearly net sales increased 47% to $7.15 billion from 2019 sales.

In March 2021, Chewy reported revenue of $2.04 billion for Q4 of 2020, making it Chewy's first quarter of net profitability, and net sales of $7.15 billion for the fiscal year. In March 2022, Chewy reported net sales of $8.89 billion for the 2021 fiscal year.

In December 2021, Chewy announced its expansion into medical insurance for pets. CarePlus, launched in 2022, will offer pet health insurance and wellness plans to more than 20 million Chewy customers.

Awards
Chewy was named a "Top 10 Employer Brand" in Boston in both 2019 and 2020. The company also received recognition from Newsweek for "America's Best Customer Service" for three consecutive years from 2019 through 2021, as well as Ad Age's distinction as one of "America’s 20 Hottest Brands 2020," and Comparably's 2020 top rankings for Best Company Culture and Best Companies for Women. Chewy was also recognized in Comparably's 2021 top rankings for Best Company Outlook, Best Product & Design and Best Engineering teams. In 2021, Chewy made its debut on the Fortune 500, Fortune magazine's annual ranking of 500 of the largest U.S. companies by revenue.

Corporate affairs
The company's founder and first CEO, Ryan Cohen, stated that he used Jeff Bezos's 1997 letter to shareholders as a roadmap for how to grow Chewy by using Amazon's guidelines on the convenience of shopping online and customer service. Cohen stepped down in March 2018, and Sumit Singh was named the company's CEO in March 2018 after working as its COO since 2017 and previously as an executive at Dell and Amazon. Singh led the company through its IPO; Chewy grew to a market capitalization of $40 billion. The company reported to have employed around 7,000 people in the United States in 2018 and more than 12,000 by 2019. The company has more than 18,000 employees in the United States as of 2021.

Locations

Chewy was founded in Dania Beach, Florida, and has additional corporate headquarters offices in Boston, Massachusetts, as of 2021. Chewy has 13 fulfillment centers In October 2020, the company launched its first fully automated distribution center.

Funding
In 2016, Chewy received $236 million in venture capital financing over five rounds. As of 2019 the company was valued at $10.2 billion.

References

External links
 

Online retailers of the United States
American companies established in 2011
Retail companies established in 2011
Internet properties established in 2011
2017 mergers and acquisitions
Pet stores
Companies based in Broward County, Florida
Companies listed on the New York Stock Exchange
2011 establishments in Florida
2019 initial public offerings